Paraíso Express (Paradise Express) is the ninth studio album recorded by Spanish singer-songwriter Alejandro Sanz. It was released by WEA Latina on November 10, 2009, (see 2009 in music) and was produced by Tommy Torres, mixed by Bob Clearmountain, mastered by Ted Jensen. This album is the follow-up to the Grammy Award-winning albums No Es lo Mismo (2003) and El Tren de los Momentos (2006). All the tracks included were written by Sanz, along with several writers, a first for the singer, and also the first album without help by Emmanuele Rufinengo and Lulo Pérez, his longtime producing team. Paraíso Express received a nomination for an Album of the Year and won Best Male Pop Vocal Album at the 11th Annual Latin Grammy Awards. It is also won a Grammy Award for Best Latin Pop Album in the 53rd Annual Grammy Awards in 2011.

Background information
In July 2009, Alejandro Sanz confirmed through his official website that he was finalizing the details of his long-awaited new album, the first since 2006, El Tren de los Momentos, which was awarded with the Grammy Award for Best Latin Pop Album and sold 120,000 units in United States. In one of his posts, the singer broadcast a video that showed Sanz and American singer-songwriter Alicia Keys recording a music video in New York City. Keys also made public the fact that she was featured on both a video and a song with Sanz, through her Twitter account. The remaining details of the album recording were a mystery. The only fact revealed was that Tommy Torres would be producing the album. Furthermore, Sanz was focused during this time on the preparation of a live performance along Colombian singer-songwriter Juanes on July 26 in Honduras. Before the release of the first single, Sanz asked to his fans and friends to send him to his website their ideas about paradise. "I was surprised that everyone was talking nearby havens that have to do with family, friends", stressed the composer during the press conference held for the album presentation. The album title was made public on September 4, 2009. The song "Looking for Paradise" was premiered on a fan club members-only section of Sanz's official site on September 18, 2009. In the track both singers performs lyrics in English and Spanish.

Singles
The first single yielded from the album, "Looking for Paradise", was preceded by a viral campaign in which fans and friends of the artist were asked to send him ideas of paradise. The song, a collaboration with American singer-songwriter Alicia Keys, became another number-one hit for Sanz in the Billboard Hot Latin Tracks chart, and the first for Keys in this chart. The album debuted at the top of the charts in Spain and the Latin charts in United States, and eventually peaked at number-one in México. "Desde Cuándo" was released as the second single of the album in 2010.

Style
 
This album marks Sanz' return to the light-hearted and melancholy song styles he had in his 2000 album El Alma al Aire, after going through more experimental or alternative stages in his two previous albums. According to Sanz, the songs included on Paraíso Express are the happiest of his career as a songwriter, but they are not "autobiographical" or "have a lot of his life", they are "common themes and attitudes of people." "Mi Peter Punk", deals with the issue of "those people who does not enjoy the stages of life"; "Hice Llorar Hasta los Angeles", refers to the author religious beliefs; "Lola Soledad" is a tribute to a very special woman in his life; and "Looking for Paradise" is about the search for a paradise for everyone of us. With Paraíso Express traded his trademark flamenco arrangements and Latin percussion beats, to get closer to a pop and British rock style. Sanz said that this was something different, "it could be a step forward or backward." On his work relationship with Torres, Sanz told: "Tommy did a perfect interpretation in that sense. Everything flowed in a very natural way."

The songs were recorded in Barcelona, Spain, and "Looking for Paradise" in New York City on Alicia Keys recording places and studio. When Sanz revealed the track listing and the official cover for the album, he said that the album was almost soft rock, and the music is more happy and calmed that the past albums.

Track listing

Charts and sales

Charts

Sales and certifications

References

2009 albums
Alejandro Sanz albums
Warner Music Latina albums
Spanish-language albums
Latin Grammy Award for Best Male Pop Vocal Album
Grammy Award for Best Latin Pop Album
Albums produced by Tommy Torres